The Great Conduit was a man-made underground channel in London, England, which brought drinking water from the Tyburn to Cheapside in the City.

In 1237 the City of London acquired the springs of the Tyburn and built a small reservoir, a head of water, to help serve the city with a steady, free, flowing supply. Work on the conduit began in 1245. It was much repaired over centuries. It ran towards Charing Cross, along the Strand north of which were fields. It then followed Fleet Street. At Fleet Street most of the city was to the north-east. It then ran along Cheapside (meaning market side, a key retail and general market of the city) where a building housed a great trough/tank and led to a surplus, overflow channel.  Citizens from this were at liberty to draw water in small amounts, and greater for permitted purposes. Wardens were appointed to stem taking too much water, unpermitted taking or diversion, and to repair pipes. Extensions were made leading to other parts of the city. Other conduits were constructed in the 15th century AD (CE).

In the 15th century further source was added to the main conduit, from the Westbourne, enabling a new, additional off-tap at Cripplegate: one parish within and one without (outside) a northern gate in ancient, sparsely intact walls.

Use of the conduit ceased after the Great Fire of London in 1666.

See also
London water supply infrastructure

References

History of the City of London
London water infrastructure